Charles Louis Marty (born 20 December 1865, date of death unknown) was a French fencer. He competed in the individual masters foil and épée events at the 1900 Summer Olympics.

References

External links
 

1865 births
Year of death missing
French male épée fencers
Olympic fencers of France
Fencers at the 1900 Summer Olympics
French male foil fencers
Sportspeople from Aveyron
Place of death missing